Berlin Sundgauer Straße (in German Bahnhof Berlin Sundgauer Straße) is a railway station in the Zehlendorf locality of Berlin, Germany, served by the Berlin S-Bahn and a local bus line.

The station opened on 1 July 1934 during the electrification of the Wannseebahn suburban railway line, originally laid in 1891. The entrance building is a protected landmark. Both the station and the adjacent street are named after the Sundgau region in France.

References

External links
Station information 

Berlin S-Bahn stations
Railway stations in Berlin
Buildings and structures in Steglitz-Zehlendorf
Railway stations in Germany opened in 1934